Oegopsida is one of the two orders of squid in the superorder Decapodiformes, in the class Cephalopoda. Together with the Myopsina, it was formerly considered to be a suborder of the order Teuthida, in which case it was known as Oegopsina. This reclassification is due to Oegopsina and Myopsina not being demonstrated to form a clade.

The Oegopsida are an often pelagic squid, with some nerito-oceanic species associated with sea mounts. They consist of 24 families and 69 genera. They have these characters in common: the head is without tentacle pockets, eyes lack a corneal covering, arms and tentacle clubs may have hooks, the buccal supports are without suckers, and oviducts in females are paired.

Two families, the Bathyteuthidae and Chtenopterygidae, which have features characteristic of the Myopsida while retaining others common to the Oegopsina, are sometimes placed in the Bathyteuthoidea.

The Oegopsida differ from the coastal Myopsida, characterised by the genus Loligo, which have corneal coverings over the eyes and tentacle pockets, but lack hooks, have no suckers on the buccal supports, and a single oviduct.

Oegopsid squid are the only decapods that lack a pocket for the tentacles. Otherwise, they share different characters with different decapod groups. Like the Bathyteuthoidea and Myopsida, the Oegopsida have a brachial canal, which is absent in other forms. As with the Spirulidae and Idiosepiidae, the Oegopsida lack suckers on the buccal supports, and like the Bathyteuthoidea, Idiosepiidae, and Spirulidae, they have no circular muscle on the suckers.

Order Oegopsida
Family Ancistrocheiridae
Family Architeuthidae
Family Bathyteuthidae
Family Batoteuthidae
Family Brachioteuthidae
Family Chiroteuthidae
Family Chtenopterygidae
Family Cranchiidae
Family Cycloteuthidae
Family Enoploteuthidae
Family Gonatidae
Family Histioteuthidae
Family Joubiniteuthidae
Family Lepidoteuthidae
Family Lycoteuthidae
Family Magnapinnidae
Family Mastigoteuthidae
Family Neoteuthidae
Family Octopoteuthidae
Family Ommastrephidae
Family Onychoteuthidae
Family Pholidoteuthidae
Family Promachoteuthidae
Family Psychroteuthidae
Family Pyroteuthidae
Family Thysanoteuthidae
Parateuthis tunicata (incertae sedis)

These families group into a number of different clades but these have not yet been formally given names. These groupings are:

Architeuthids 
Architeuthidae
Neoteuthidae
Brachioteuthids 
Brachioteuthidae 
Chiroteuthids
Batoteuthidae
Chiroteuthidae
Joubiniteuthidae
Magnapinnidae
Mastigoteuthidae
Promachoteuthidae
Cranchiids
Cranchiidae
Cycloteuthids
Cycloteuthidae
Enoploteuthids
Ancistrocheiridae
Enoploteuthidae
Lycoteuthidae
Pyroteuthidae
Gonatids
Gonatidae
Histioteuthids
Histioteuthidae
Psychroteuthidae
Lepidoteuthida
Lepidoteuthidae
Octopoteuthidae
Pholidoteuthidae
Ommastrephids
Ommastrephidae
Onychoteuthids
Onychoteuthidae
Thysanoteuthids
Thysanoteuthidae

References

External links

 

Squid